The following is a list of Portugal-related articles. Those interested in the subject can monitor changes to the pages by clicking on Related changes in the sidebar.

0–9
1383–1385 Crisis ·
1755 Lisbon earthquake ·
1969 Portugal earthquake

A
A Portuguesa · 
Afonso I of Portugal ·
Afonso II of Portugal ·
Afonso III of Portugal ·
Afonso IV of Portugal ·
Afonso V of Portugal ·
Afonso VI of Portugal ·
Algarve ·
Alexandre Herculano de Carvalho e Araujo ·
Alves Reis ·
Angel of Portugal  .
Anglo-Portuguese Alliance ·
Angola ·
Anthony of Portugal ·
António de Oliveira Salazar ·
António de Spínola ·
Assembly of the Republic (Portugal) ·
Autonomous Regions of Portugal ·
Avante! ·
Azores ·
Azulejo

B
Bank of Portugal ·
Battle of Albuera ·
Battle of Alcazarquivir ·
Battle of Alfarrobeira ·
Battle of Aljubarrota ·
Battle of Atoleiros ·
Battle of Covadonga ·
Battle of Guararapes (2nd) ·
Battle of Ourique ·
Battle of São Mamede ·
Bracari ·
Brazil

C
Carlos I of Portugal ·
Carnation Revolution ·
Cape Verde ·
Castro (village) ·
Catholic Church in Portugal ·
Cavaquinho ·
Celtiberians ·
Celtici ·
Chaul ·
Coat of arms of Portugal ·
Coelerni ·
Colonial Heads of Bissau ·
Colonial Heads of Cacheu ·
Colonial Heads of Portuguese Guinea ·
Communications in Portugal ·
Conferência das Organizações Nacionalistas das Colónias Portuguesas ·
Conquest of Ceuta ·
Conservation areas of Portugal ·
Converso ·
Conii ·
County of Portugal ·
CPLP ·
Crime in Portugal ·
Culture of Portugal

D
Dadra and Nagar Haveli ·
Daman and Diu ·
Demographics of Portugal ·
Denis of Portugal ·
Drug policy of Portugal

E
East Timor ·
Economy of Portugal ·
Economic history of Portugal ·
Education in Portugal ·
Edward of Portugal ·
Elections in Portugal ·
Elmina ·
Elmina Castle ·
Equaesi ·
Estado Novo (Portugal)

F
Fado ·
Fernando I of Portugal ·
Flag of Portugal ·
Foreign relations of Portugal ·
Fort of São João Baptista de Ajudá ·
Funchal

G
Gallaecia ·
Garcia II of Galicia ·
Geography of Portugal ·
Ginjinha ·
Goa ·
Greater Lisbon ·
Greater Porto ·
Grovii ·
Guinea-Bissau ·

H
Henry of Portugal (disambiguation) ·
Hispania ·
History of Portugal ·
House of Capet

I
Iberian peninsula ·
Iberian Union ·
Interamici ·
ISCTE

J
John I of Portugal ·
John II of Portugal ·
John III of Portugal ·
John IV of Portugal ·
John V of Portugal ·
John VI of Portugal ·
Joseph I of Portugal ·
Judiciary of Portugal

K
Kingdom of Galicia ·
Kingdom of Portugal ·
Kionga Triangle

L
Law enforcement in Portugal ·
Leonor of Viseu ·
Leuni ·
Liberalism in Portugal ·
Liberal Wars ·
Limici ·
Limpieza de sangre ·
Lines of Torres Vedras ·
Lisbon ·
Lisbon metropolitan area ·
Lisbon Metro ·
List of Cities in Portugal ·
List of museums in Portugal ·
List of political parties in Portugal ·
List of Portuguese artists -
List of Portuguese birds ·
List of Portuguese companies ·
List of Portuguese flags ·
List of Portuguese islands ·
List of Portuguese monarchs ·
List of Portuguese people ·
List of presidents of Portugal ·
List of prime ministers of Portugal ·
List of rivers of Portugal ·
List of schools in Portugal .
List of universities in Portugal ·
Luanqui ·
Luis I of Portugal ·
Lusitania ·
Lusitanian language ·
Lusitanian mythology ·
Lusitanians ·
Lusitanic ·
Lusophone ·
Lusophony Games

M
Macau ·
Malacca ·
Madeira Island ·
Madeira wine ·
Manuel I of Portugal ·
Manuel II of Portugal ·
Marcomanni ·
Marcelo Caetano ·
Maria I of Portugal ·
Maria II of Portugal ·
Miguel of Portugal ·
Military of Portugal ·
Miranda do Douro ·
Mirandese language ·
Monuments of Portugal ·
Moors ·
Mozambique ·
Multibanco ·
Municipalities of Portugal ·
Munuza ·
Music of Portugal ·
Muslim Conquest of Spain

N
Narbasi ·
Nemetati

O
Oestriminis ·
Olivenza ·
Ophiussa ·
Order of Aviz ·
Order of Christ ·
Our Lady of Fatima

P
Paesuri ·
Pastel de nata ·
Patriarch of Lisbon ·
Pedro I of Brazil ·
Peter I of Portugal ·
Peter II of Portugal ·
Peter III of Portugal ·
Pedro V of Portugal ·
Pedro Santana Lopes ·
Peneda-Gerês National Park ·
Peninsular War ·
Philip II of Spain ·
Philip III of Spain ·
Philip IV of Spain ·
Pimba ·
Pink Map ·
Political divisions of Portugal ·
Politics of Portugal ·
Porto ·
Porto Metro ·
Porto Santo Island ·
Portugal ·
Portugal Day ·
Portugal in the Great War ·
Portugal in the period of discoveries ·
Portuguese Angola ·
Portuguese Cape Verde ·  
Portuguese Ceylon ·
Portuguese Colonial War ·
Portuguese Communist Party ·
Portuguese Constitution ·
Portuguese Council of State ·
Portuguese Creole ·
Portuguese cuisine ·
Portuguese Empire ·
Portuguese euro coins ·
Portuguese guitar ·
Portuguese hip hop ·
Portuguese India ·
Portuguese Inquisition ·
Portuguese inventions ·
Portuguese Guinea ·
Portuguese (Guyana) ·
Portuguese language ·
Portuguese literature ·
Portuguese nationality law ·
Portuguese military history ·
Portuguese Mozambique ·
Portuguese pavement ·
Portuguese people ·
Portuguese São Tomé and Príncipe ·
Portuguese Timor ·
Port wine ·
Public holidays in Portugal

Q
Quadi ·
Quaquerni

R
Raul Pires Ferreira Chaves ·
Reconquista ·
Religion in Portugal ·
Roman Geography of Portugal · 
Rádio e Televisão de Portugal ·
Royal Patriarchal Music Seminary of Lisbon

S
Sancho I of Portugal ·
Sancho II of Portugal ·
São Tomé and Príncipe ·
Savage Islands ·
Scouting in Portugal ·
Sebastian of Portugal ·
Serra da Estrela ·
Serra d'El-Rei ·
Seurbi ·
Siege of Lisbon ·
Social Democratic Party (Portugal) ·
Socialist Party (Portugal) ·
Suevi

T
Tamagani ·
Tapoli ·
The Consolidation of the Monarchy in Portugal ·
The establishment of the monarchy in Portugal ·
The Portugal News ·
Timeline of Portuguese history ·
Transportation in Portugal ·
Treaty of Madrid (13 January 1750) ·
Treaty of Tordesillas ·
Treaty of Windsor 1386 ·
Turduli ·
Turduli Veteres ·
Turdulorum Oppida ·
Turodi

U
Urraca of Portugal

V
Vandals ·
Via Verde ·
Verde wine ·
Vímara Peres ·
Viriathus ·
Visa requirements for Portuguese citizens ·
Visigoths

W
Water supply and sanitation in Portugal ·
Wines of Portugal

X

Y

Z
Zambezia Province ·
Zoelae

See also
 Lists of country-related topics

Portugal